Keith Lamont Franklin (born March 4, 1970) is a former American football linebacker. He played college football at South Carolina. He was signed as an undrafted free agent by the Los Angeles Raiders of the National Football League (NFL).

He also spent time playing for the Amsterdam Admirals and Barcelona Dragons of the World League of American Football (WLAF), later known as NFL Europe, BC Lions of the Canadian Football League (CFL), and the Birmingham Thunderbolts of the short-lived XFL.

Early years
Franklin attended the University of South Carolina where he was a two-year starter. As a senior, he recorded 39 tackles.

Professional career
After going unselected in the 1994 NFL Draft, Franklin was signed by the Los Angeles Raiders. In 1995, he played for the Amsterdam Admirals of the World League of American Football (WLAF) later known as NFL Europe. Later in the year, he appeared in two games for the Raiders. In 1996, with the Admirals, he recorded 55 tackles and one sack and two interceptions. He joined the Barcelona Dragons in 1998 but missed the season due to an injury. In 1999, he joined the BC Lions of the Canadian Football League (CFL), where he recorded 13 tackles, one sack and one interception. In 2000, he recorded 32 tackles and one sack. In 2001, he joined the Birmingham Thunderbolts of the XFL.

References

1970 births
American football linebackers
Canadian football linebackers
American players of Canadian football
South Carolina Gamecocks football players
Amsterdam Admirals players
Oakland Raiders players
BC Lions players
Birmingham Thunderbolts players
Los Angeles Raiders players
Players of American football from Los Angeles
Living people
Susan Miller Dorsey High School alumni
Players of Canadian football from Los Angeles